C. Gopal Mudaliyar is a politician from Tamil Nadu, India. He was elected from the Sholinghur constituency to the Seventh Tamil Nadu Legislative Assembly as a member of the All India Anna Dravida Munnetra Kazhagam political party in 1980 and he was elected as MP from the Arakkonam (Lok Sabha constituency) to the 12th Lok Sabha in 1998.

He was born in Sengunthar Kaikola Mudaliyar community. His son N. G. Parthiban was elected as MLA from the Sholinghur constituency in 2016.

References 

Amma Makkal Munnetra Kazhagam politicians
Living people
India MPs 1998–1999
Year of birth missing (living people)
All India Anna Dravida Munnetra Kazhagam politicians